Saddleback Mountain is a mountain located in Essex County, New York. 
The mountain is part of the Great Range of the Adirondack Mountains.
Saddleback Mtn. is flanked to the southwest by Basin Mountain, and to the east by Gothics.

Saddleback Mountain stands within the watershed of the East Branch of the Ausable River, which drains into Lake Champlain, thence into Canada's Richelieu River, the Saint Lawrence River, and into the Gulf of Saint Lawrence.
The southeast end and southwest side of Saddleback Mtn. drain into Shanty Brook, thence into the East Branch of the Ausable River between Upper and Lower Ausable Lake. 
The northwest end of Saddleback Mtn. drains into Chicken Coop Brook, thence into Johns Brook and the East Branch.
The northeast side of Saddleback Mtn. drains into Ore Bed Brook, thence into Johns Brook.

Saddleback Mountain is within the High Peaks Wilderness Area of Adirondack State Park.

See also 
 List of mountains in New York
 Northeast 111 4,000-footers
 Adirondack High Peaks
 Adirondack Forty-Sixers

Notes

External links 
  Peakbagger.com: Saddleback Mountain
  Summitpost.org: Saddleback Mountain
 

Mountains of Essex County, New York
Adirondack High Peaks
Mountains of New York (state)